Milroy Township is one of thirteen townships in Jasper County, Indiana, United States. As of the 2010 census, its population was 276 and it contained 113 housing units.

Geography

Adjacent townships
 Hanging Grove Township (northeast)
 Monon Township, White County (east)
 Princeton Township, White County (south)
 Jordan Township (west)
 Marion Township (northwest)

Cemeteries
The township contains one cemetery, Milroy.

Major highways
  Indiana State Road 16

References
 U.S. Board on Geographic Names (GNIS)
 United States Census Bureau cartographic boundary files

Education
Milroy Township residents are eligible to obtain a free library card from the Jasper County Public Library.

External links
 Indiana Township Association
 United Township Association of Indiana

Townships in Jasper County, Indiana
Townships in Indiana